This is a list of the largest gold mines by 2022 production, measured in thousands of troy ounces.

See also
List of largest mining companies by revenue
List of largest manufacturing companies by revenue
List of largest aluminum producers by output
List of deepest mines

References

External links
mining.com website

Economy-related lists of superlatives
Lists of gold mines